Waygate may refer to:

 Gates of gateways
 Sluices of watermills, barrages, dams; and their gates
 Watergate (architecture)
 Waygate (Wheel of Time), a method to enter The Ways (Wheel of Time)

See also
 Gateway (disambiguation)
 Gate (disambiguation)
 Way (disambiguation)